Patrick John "Pat" Moriarty (born May 19, 1955 in Cleveland, Ohio) is a football executive for the Baltimore Ravens in the National Football League. He played college football for the Georgia Tech Yellow Jackets football  and professionally for the 1979 Cleveland Browns.

External links
Pat Moriarty on databasefootball.com
Ravens profile

1955 births
Living people
Sportspeople from Cleveland
Players of American football from Cleveland
American football running backs
Georgia Tech Yellow Jackets football players
Cleveland Browns players
Baltimore Ravens executives
University of Baltimore School of Law alumni